Bosnia and Herzegovina competed at the 2014 Summer Youth Olympics, in Nanjing, China from 16 August to 28 August 2014.

Medalists

Athletics

Bosnia and Herzegovina qualified one athlete.

Qualification Legend: Q=Final A (medal); qB=Final B (non-medal); qC=Final C (non-medal); qD=Final D (non-medal); qE=Final E (non-medal)

Boys
Track & road events

Judo

Bosnia and Herzegovina qualified two athletes based on its performance at the 2013 Cadet World Judo Championships.

Individual

Team

Swimming

Bosnia and Herzegovina qualified two swimmers.

Boys

Girls

Taekwondo

Bosnia and Herzegovina was given a wild card to compete.

Girls

References

2014 in Bosnia and Herzegovina sport
Nations at the 2014 Summer Youth Olympics
Bosnia and Herzegovina at the Youth Olympics